Cho Seung-jae (born December 12, 1990) is a wushu taolu athlete from South Korea.

Career

Junior 
During his junior career, Cho was a gold medalist and silver medalist at the 2007 Asian Junior Wushu Championships, and a silver medalist in jianshu at the 2008 World Junior Wushu Championships.

Senior 
Cho made his senior international debut at the 2012 Asian Wushu Championships where he won a silver medal in gunshu. He then was a double silver medalist in daoshu and gunshu combined as well as in duilian at the 2013 East Asian Games. He then won a silver medal in daoshu and bronze medals in gunshu and duilian at the 2013 World Wushu Championships. Two years later, Cho won a silver medal in daoshu and bronze medal in gunshu at the 2015 World Wushu Championships, and became the Asian champion in gunshu at the 2016 Asian Wushu Championships. At the 2017 World Wushu Championships, he won a silver medal in shuangdao. He then competed in the 2018 Asian Games where he won the silver medal in men's daoshu and gunshu combined. His most recent competition was at the 2019 World Wushu Championships where he was the world champion in shuangdao and a double silver medalist in gunshu and duilian.

See also 

 List of Asian Games medalists in wushu

References

External links 

 Athlete profile at the 2018 Asian Games

1990 births
Living people
South Korean wushu practitioners
Wushu practitioners at the 2018 Asian Games
Asian Games medalists in wushu
Asian Games silver medalists for South Korea
Medalists at the 2018 Asian Games